IACC may refer to:
 Interagency Autism Coordinating Committee of the U.S. Department of Health and Human Services.
 International America's Cup Class
 International Anti-Corruption Conference
 Instituto de Aeronáutica Civil de Cuba
 Israeli antisemitic cartoons contest
 Indian Association of Clinical Cardiologists
 Instituto Atlético Central Córdoba